Bob O'Connor may refer to:
 Bob O'Connor (mayor) (1944–2006), mayor of Pittsburgh, Pennsylvania, 2006
 Bob O'Connor (American football) (1904–1998), American football player

See also
Robert O'Connor (disambiguation)